Délice Paloma is a 2007 French-Algerian film directed by Nadir Moknèche and starring Biyouna. It tells the story of Madame Aldjeria, her past life, her glory,  her dream, and her downfall as queen of petty dealing, 'the mafieuse', against the backdrop of Algiers and the Algeria of Independence to today.

Plot
"You need a building permit? You are alone one evening? Call the national benefactress, Madame  Aldjéria: she will arrange it. The one that was given the name of the country will stop at no scheming to survive in Algeria today. If they are pretty  and not too scrupulous, recruits can make a career. The latest, Paloma, made a great effect, -  especially on Riyadh, the son of Ms. Aldjéria. The re-sale of the Baths of Caracalla in Tipaza, the dream which was to allow the clan  Aldjéria to change its life will be a scam too far."

Cast 
Biyouna as Zineb Agha/Madame Aldjeria
Nadia Kaci as Shéhérazade
Aylin Prandi as Paloma/Rachida
Daniel Lundh as Riyad
Fadila Ouabdesselam as Mina
Hafsa Koudil as Madame Bellil
Ahmed Benaissa as Monsieur Bellil
Nawel Zmit as Baya
Lu Xiuliang as Mister Zhang
Karim Moussaoui as Shéhérazade's husband

Awards
The film won the award for best French language title hailing from a country other than France at the 2008 Lumiere Awards.

References

External links
On the site of the distributor
 
 

2007 films
Algerian drama films
Films set in Algiers
French drama films
2000s French-language films
Best French-Language Film Lumières Award winners
2000s French films